Pigne d'Arolla (3,796 m) is a mountain in the Pennine Alps in Switzerland. The first ascent was made by A. W. Moore and Horace Walker with the guide Jakob Anderegg on 9 July 1865. It is commonly climbed as part of the Haute Route.

Route
It is considered non-technical and easy for fit and experienced trekkers with snow skills.

2018 ski-hiking accident
Seven skiers in a party of 14 who made an unplanned overnight stay at 3,000 metres on the mountain in a snowstorm in April 2018, died of hypothermia or fall.

References

External links
 Pigne d'Arolla on SummitPost

Mountains of the Alps
Alpine three-thousanders
Mountains of Valais
Pennine Alps
Mountains of Switzerland